Pierluigi Sammarchi (born 2 November 1949) is an Italian actor and comedian.

Biography 
He formed with friend Andrea Roncato the duo Gigi e Andrea, that became very popular in Italian television, appearing also in a number of successful 1980s comedy films such as Qua la mano (1980), I camionisti (1982), L'allenatore nel pallone (1984), I pompieri (1985) and Rimini Rimini (1987). In 1988, he starred as Commissioner Sangiorgi in the TV series Don Tonino.

After a 20-years hiatus, he returned to acting in the 2008 comedy Benvenuti in amore. In 2018 he guest starred in an episode of the crime series L'ispettore Coliandro.

Filmography

Film 
Qua la mano (1980)
I camionisti (1982)
Acapulco, prima spiaggia... a sinistra (1983)
Se tutto va bene siamo rovinati (1983)
L'allenatore nel pallone (1984) 
Mezzo destro mezzo sinistro - 2 calciatori senza pallone (1985) 
I pompieri (1985)
Doppio misto (1986)
Tango blu (1987) 
Rimini Rimini (1987) 
Il lupo di mare (1987)
Benvenuti in amore (2008)

TV series 
Don Tonino (1988)
L'Odissea (1991)
L'ispettore Coliandro (2018)

References

External links 

1949 births
Italian male comedians
Italian male film actors
Italian male stage actors
Italian male television actors
Italian television personalities
Living people
Actors from Bologna